Methoxpropamine (MXPr, 2-Oxo-3'-methoxy-PCPr) is a dissociative anesthetic drug of the arylcyclohexylamine class and NMDA receptor antagonist that is closely related to substances such as methoxetamine and PCPr. It has been sold online as a designer drug, first being identified in Denmark in October 2019, and is illegal in Finland.

See also
 Methoxmetamine
 Methoxyketamine
 MXiPr
 SN 35210

References

Arylcyclohexylamines
Designer drugs
Dissociative drugs
O-methylated phenols